Oscar Wiggli (9 March 1927 – 26 January 2016) was a Swiss composer and sculptor.

Biography
Oscar Wiggli was born in Solothurn in 1927. After working a few years as a mechanic, he studied architecture at the Zurich University from 1949 to 1951. He created his first wrought iron sculptures in 1955. Since 1956, he lives in Paris and in Muriaux, in Switzerland. In 1980, his works were shown in the Swiss Pavilion at the Venice Biennale. From 1981 on, he also started experimenting and composing with electronic instruments. 
In 2007, a retrospective was held in the Kunstmuseum Bern with the Zentrum Paul Klee, both in Bern.

Notes

External links
Neue Zuricher Zeitung review of Wiggli's work
 

2016 deaths
1927 births
Swiss composers
Swiss male composers
Swiss sculptors
People from Solothurn